Ellis–Van Creveld syndrome (also called  mesoectodermal dysplasia but see 'Nomenclature' section below) is a rare genetic disorder of the skeletal dysplasia type.

Signs and symptoms

It involves numerous anomalies including:
 Post-axial polydactyly
 Congenital heart defects (most commonly an atrial septal defect producing a common atrium, occurring in 60% of affected individuals)
 Teeth present at birth (natal teeth)
 Fingernail dysplasia
 Short-limbed dwarfism, mesomelic pattern
 Short ribs
 Cleft palate
 Malformation of the wrist bones (fusion of the hamate and capitate bones).

Genetics
Ellis–Van Creveld syndrome often is the result of founder effects in isolated human populations, such as the Amish and some small island inhabitants. Although relatively rare, this disorder does occur with higher incidence within founder-effect populations due to lack of genetic variability. Observation of the inheritance pattern has illustrated that the disease is autosomal recessive, meaning that both parents have to carry the gene in order for an individual to be affected by the disorder.

Ellis–Van Creveld syndrome is caused by a mutation in the EVC gene, as well as by a mutation in a nonhomologous gene, EVC2, located close to the EVC gene in a head-to-head configuration. The gene was identified by positional cloning. The EVC gene maps to the chromosome 4 short arm (4p16). The function of a healthy EVC gene is not well understood at this time.

Relation to other rare disorders:  genetic ciliopathy 
Until recently, the medical literature did not indicate a connection among many genetic disorders, both genetic syndromes and genetic diseases, that are now being found to be related.  As a result of new genetic research, some of these are, in fact, highly related in their root cause despite the widely varying set of medical symptoms that are clinically visible in the disorders.  Ellis–Van Creveld syndrome is one such  disease, part of an emerging class of diseases called ciliopathies.  The underlying cause may be a dysfunctional molecular mechanism in the primary cilia structures of the cell, organelles which are present in many cellular types throughout the human body.  The cilia defects adversely affect "numerous critical developmental signaling pathways" essential to cellular development and thus offer a plausible hypothesis for the often multi-symptom nature of a large set of syndromes and diseases.  Known ciliopathies include primary ciliary dyskinesia, Bardet–Biedl syndrome, polycystic kidney and liver disease, nephronophthisis, Alström syndrome, Meckel–Gruber syndrome and some forms of retinal degeneration.

Weyers acrofacial dysostosis is due to another mutation in the EVC gene and hence is allelic with Ellis–Van Creveld syndrome.

Treatment
There is no causative / curative therapy. Symptomatic medical treatments are focussing on symptoms caused by orthopaedic, dental or cardiac problems. Regarding perioperative / anesthesiological management, recommendations for medical professionals are published at OrphanAnesthesia.

History
Each had a patient with this syndrome, as they had discovered when they met in the same train compartment on the way to a pediatrics conference in England in the late 1930s. A third patient had been referred to by L. Emmett Holt, Jr. and Rustin McIntosh in a textbook of pediatrics (Holt and McIntosh, 1933) and was included in full in the paper by Ellis and Van Creveld (1940).

McCusick et al. (1964) followed up with a study of its incidence in the Amish population. He observed the largest pedigree so far, in an inbred religious isolate, the Old Order Amish, in Lancaster County, Pennsylvania. Almost as many persons were known in this one kindred as had been reported in all the medical literature up to that time.

Nomenclature
'Six-fingered dwarfism' ('digital integer deficiency') was an alternative designation used for this condition when it was being studied in the Amish and may have served a useful function in defining this then little known condition for the medical profession, as well as the lay public. The term, however, has been found offensive by some because of the reference to the polydactyly, which is seen as a 'freakish' label. For this reason, six-fingered dwarfism has been removed as an alternative name for this entry. This leaves Ellis–Van Creveld syndrome with its initialism, EVC, as the only satisfactory designation. Chondroectodermal dysplasia and mesoectodermal dysplasia do not well define the entity and are not satisfactory for general usage, either medical or otherwise.

References

External links 

Autosomal recessive disorders
Genodermatoses
Syndromes affecting the heart
Syndromes affecting teeth
Syndromes affecting stature
Syndromes with dysmelia
Rare genetic syndromes